The 2014 Big Ten Conference men's soccer season was the 24th season of men's varsity soccer in the conference.

Penn State Nittany Lions were the two-time defending regular season champions, while the Indiana Hoosiers were the defending tournament champions.

Changes from 2013 
Rutgers and Maryland joined the conference from the American Athletic Conference and Atlantic Coast Conference respectively.

Preseason 
Newcomers Maryland was picked to win the conference ahead of Penn State.

Preseason poll

Teams

Stadia and locations 

 Illinois, Iowa, Minnesota, Nebraska and Purdue do not sponsor men's soccer

Personnel

Regular season

Results

Postseason

Big Ten Tournament

NCAA Tournament

Statistics

See also 

 Big Ten Conference
 2014 Big Ten Conference Men's Soccer Tournament
 2014 NCAA Division I men's soccer season
 2014 in American soccer

References 

 
2014 NCAA Division I men's soccer season
2014